= Samouil Niavradakis =

Greek footballer

Personal information
- Date of birth: 20 February 2002 (age 24)
- Place of birth: Greece
- Position: Centre-back

Youth career
- Platanias

Senior career*
Years	Team	Apps	(Gls)
2019–2020	Platanias	7	(0)
- * Club domestic league appearances and goals as of 29 February 2020

Samouil Niavradakis (Greek: Σαμουήλ Νιαυραδάκης; born 20 February 2002) is a Greek professional footballer who plays as a centre-back.
